Colombo Tamil may refer to:
Sri Lankan Tamils, of Colombo, Sri Lanka
Colombo Tamil dialect, dialect of Colombo Tamil people